Black Feathers (Italian: Penne nere) is a 1952 Italian war drama film directed by Oreste Biancoli and starring Marcello Mastroianni, Marina Vlady and Camillo Pilotto.  It was shot at the Titanus Studios in Rome. The film's sets were designed by the art director Ottavio Scotti.

Plot 
Two young people, Pieri Cossutti and Gemma Vianello, live their love in the town of Stella, an alpine village in Carnia located next to a large dam, not far from the border between Italy and Austria. The Second World War provokes the call to arms of Pieri and his brother Olinto, who must leave his wife and little son. Gemma's father dies during a bombing, and at that point she is welcomed into the Cossutti house.

At the time of the armistice of 8 September, Pieri and Olinto are in Albania, from where - with other Italian soldiers who refuse to surrender to the Germans - they begin a long march to return to their homeland. Among the hardships, the group gradually shrinks and even Olinto dies.

Pieri and a few others arrive in Stella and are able to courageously prevent the Germans from blowing up the great dam. Gemma is injured and Pieri decides to marry her on the verge of death. The woman, however, against all odds, recovers and the two will finally live their complete love story.

Cast
 Marcello Mastroianni as Pietro 'Pieri' Cossutti
 Marina Vlady as Gemma Vianello 
 Camillo Pilotto as Zef Cossutti - il nonno
 Vera Carmi as Catina Cossutti
 Guido Celano as Olinto Cossutti
 Enzo Staiola as Antonio 'Tonino' Cossutti
 Hélène Vallier as Natalìa Cossutti
 Liuba Soukhanowa as Giulia Cossutti
 Giuseppe Chirarandini as Don Angelo - il prete

References

Bibliography
 Perra, Emiliano. Conflicts of Memory: The Reception of Holocaust Films and TV Programmes in Italy, 1945 to the Present. Peter Lang, 2010.

External links

1952 films
1950s Italian-language films
Italian World War II films
Italian black-and-white films
Films directed by Oreste Biancoli
Italian war drama films
1950s war drama films
1950s Italian films